Interservice rivalry is rivalry between different branches of a country's armed forces. This may include competition between land, marine, naval, coastal, air, or space forces.

Interservice rivalry can occur over such topics as the appropriation of the military budget, prestige, or the possession of certain types of equipment or units. The latter case can arise, for example, when a navy operates naval aviation units, which can be viewed by the air force as an infringement of its traditional responsibilities.

For the most part, interservice rivalries may only be limited to administrative or internal functions, and the branches may otherwise have warm relations and a willingness to work together when necessary. However, in rare instances, interservice rivalries may be so severe that the branches will outright refuse to cooperate or may even sabotage each other, even during an ongoing war or when lives are at stake (such as the rivalry between the Imperial Japanese Army and Imperial Japanese Navy).

The term also applies to rivalries between a country’s intelligence services and law enforcement agencies (e.g. the FBI and CIA in the United States), the emergency services of a jurisdiction (e.g. the NYPD and FDNY in New York City), or separate agencies in similar or overlapping jurisdictions (e.g. the LAPD and LASD in Los Angeles County, California).

Cases

Germany
Many military analysts consider the Wehrmacht, Nazi Germany's armed forces, pioneers of "jointness" (integrierter Kriegführung, in German). They point out that Blitzkrieg, the war-fighting style that brought the Wehrmacht stunning victories between 1939 and 1941, depended upon the close integration of ground and air (and sometimes naval) forces and that even after the Blitzkrieg campaigns gave way to a drawn-out war of attrition, the Wehrmacht routinely conducted operations in a way that would today be called "joint". That is, elements of two or more services participated in close cooperation with mutually agreed goals, relatively little interservice rivalry, and a command structure that, at least at the "sharp end" of operations, promoted, rather than inhibited, a spirit of jointness. Consequently, the analysts assert, the Wehrmacht enhanced its capabilities and improved its combat effectiveness.
 
Adolf Hitler understood the value of integrating his land, sea and air forces and placing them under a unified command, the Oberkommando der Wehrmacht (first under Field Marshal Werner von Blomberg's command; later his own). He also saw the benefit of placing them under operational commanders who possessed at least a rudimentary understanding of the tactics, techniques, needs, capabilities and limitations of each of the services functioning in their combat zone. Hitler was thus innovative and several years ahead of his peers in the democracies, Italy and the Soviet Union. Yet, largely because of Hitler's unusual and autocratic command style and difficulties with delegation, the Wehrmacht lacked elements that today's theorists consider essential to the attainment of truly productive jointness (a single joint commander or Joint Chief of Staff, a proper joint staff, a joint planning process, and an absence of inter-service rivalry) and that, as a result, it often suffered needless difficulties in combat.

Iran
The rivalries shaped between security organizations in Iran are as follows: 
 Persian Cossack Brigade and Gendarmerie (1912–1921)
 Second Bureau of Imperial Iranian Army, SAVAK and Shahrbani (1957–1979)
 Islamic Revolutionary Guard Corps, Islamic Revolutionary Committees and Shahrbani (1979–1991)
 Islamic Revolutionary Guard Corps and Basij (1979–1981)
 Islamic Revolutionary Guard Corps and Islamic Republic of Iran Army (1979–present)
 Islamic Revolutionary Guard Corps and Ministry of Intelligence (Intensified since 2009)

India
Infighting between the Indian Army and Indian Air Force over armed helicopters came to light during the Kargil War in 1999.

This dispute erupted again in 2012 when the two branches fought over the allocation of AH-64D Apache Longbow helicopters.

In 2013, Air Chief Marshal NAK Browne, who faced off against the Army for the helicopter issue, said that the AH-64Ds would be kept in the Air Force.

Japan

The long-term discord between the Imperial Japanese Army and Imperial Japanese Navy was one of the most notorious examples of interservice rivalry. The situation, with its origin traced back to the Meiji period, came with both geopolitical and military consequences leading to Japan's involvement in World War II. The IJA/IJN rivalry expressed itself in the early 1930s as the "strike north" (Hokushin-ron) and "strike south" (Nanshin-ron) factions. The goal of both factions was to seize territories which possessed the raw materials, especially petroleum, which Japan needed to sustain its growth and economy, but which it did not possess itself. The strike north faction advocated the taking of the natural resources of Siberia, by way of Manchuria, a scenario in which the prime role would be taken by the Army, the strike south faction advocated the taking of the oil-rich Dutch East Indies, a scenario in which the Navy would predominate.

In order to further their own faction, relatively junior officers resorted to the assassinations of members of the rival faction and their supporters in government. With both factions being opposed to the peace faction, this period has become known as the era of "government by assassination". Insubordination by the Kwantung Army led first to the occupation of Manchuria, and later the Second Sino-Japanese War following the Marco Polo Bridge Incident. However, at the Battles of Khalkhin Gol, any farther expansion northwards into Siberia was shown to be impossible given the Soviet superiority in numbers and armour.

With the loss of Army prestige that followed the failure of the Soviet–Japanese border conflicts, the Navy faction gained the ascendency, supported by a number of the powerful industrial zaibatsu, that were convinced that their interests would be best served fulfilling the needs of the Navy, thus paving the way to the Pacific War.

The rivalry between the IJA and IJN also saw both services developing air arms; the Army creating its own amphibious infantry units and running ships and submarines, including submarine chasers and aircraft carriers; and the Navy creating its own infantry and marine paratroopers.

Significant examples of this rivalry include the Japanese Navy taking several weeks to inform the Army of the disastrous results of the Battle of Midway, and dysfunction between the IJA and IJN during the Guadalcanal campaign.

Pakistan
The Pakistani Armed Forces used to fight over a number of issues. One in particular was predominantly between the Navy and the Army over budget distribution. A key point of friction was the induction of the cruiser PNS Babur. This was resolved when Pakistani think tanks realized the need for interservice harmony and established the Joint Services Headquarters, which reduces friction between the services.

United States
The United States Department of Defense was originally created to provide overall coordination for the various branches of the U.S. Armed Forces, whose infighting, particularly between the Army and Navy, was seen as detrimental to military effectiveness during World War II.

The rivalries are also based on services' individual philosophies for rules and behavior. An author wrote in 2012 about the differing cultures of the United States Air Force and the United States Navy's pilots:

Various mechanisms are used to manage or curb interservice rivalries. In the United States Armed Forces, for example, an officer must complete at least one joint tour in another service to reach the level of Flag or General Officer. Such officers may be described as "wearing purple," a reference to the symbolic colors of each branch: red (Marines), green (Army), and blue (Air Force, Navy, Coast Guard).

One well-known encounter, the Revolt of the Admirals, took place after the end of World War II. The newly-created United States Air Force sought to create a doctrine which relied heavily on strategic long-range bombing and the Army a large number of reservist troops. Both the Air Force and the Army claimed that the future of warfare depended on the issue of nuclear deterrent, and as such the use of naval gunfire support, as well as the amphibious assault doctrine of the U.S. Marine Corps, was outdated and would never be used again. The Secretary of Defense Louis A. Johnson proceeded to strip the Navy of funds on its first supercarrier, the United States. This cancellation caused multiple high ranking Navy personnel to resign. The aftermath backfired against the Navy, and caused Congress to review, and after investigation enabled the implementation of the creation of a Strategic Air Force supporting a nuclear mission.

Previously, during the presidencies of Harry S. Truman and Dwight D. Eisenhower, the Chairman of the Joint Chiefs of Staff position rotated between armed forces service branches. However, in 1962, when President John F. Kennedy appointed General Maxwell Taylor to replace the incumbent, General Lyman Lemnitzer who had been the Chairman since 1960, the rotation between the Air Force, Navy, Marines, and Army was broken as both Taylor and Lemnitzer served in the Army. When General Earle Wheeler was appointed as Joint Chiefs of Staff Chairman by President Lyndon Johnson in 1964, it resulted in Army generals holding the Chairman position for three consecutive terms, from 1960 to 1970. Army generals again served as Joint Chiefs of Staff Chairman for three consecutive terms from 1989 to 2001, when President George H.W. Bush appointed Army general Colin Powell as Chairman in 1989, and when Powell retired in 1993 he was replaced by another Army general, John Shalikashvili, who was appointed by President Bill Clinton, and when Shalikashvili retired in 1997 he was again replaced by an Army general, Hugh Shelton, until finally, when Shelton retired in 2001,  he was replaced by non-army officer, Air Force general Richard B. Myers, who succeeded Shelton as Chairman in October, 2001.

In December 2018, with the incumbent Chairman of the Joint Chiefs of Staff General Joseph Dunford scheduled to retire the following year, Secretary of Defense James Mattis recommended to President Donald Trump that he pick incumbent Air Force Chief of Staff General David L. Goldfein to be Dunford's successor. Dunford agreed with the choice of Mattis as his successor, especially since no Air Force Generals had been Chairman since General Richard B. Myers retired in 2005. However due to Trump's recent conflict with Dunford and Mattis, instead of taking their recommendation, Trump selected Army Chief of Staff General Mark Milley to be Dunford's successor. The nomination sparked controversy due to previous Joint Chiefs of Staff Chairman before Dunford. General Martin Dempsey was from the Army and if Goldfein had been selected, he would have been the Air Force's first chairman since 2005. Many believed that Trump picked Milley due to a close and personal friendship between the two since early in Trump's presidency. By the time Milley assumed the Joint Chiefs of Staff Chairman position in October 2019, exactly half of the Joint Chiefs of Staff Chairman—10 out of 20—had been filled by Army generals.

The United States Unified Combatant Command was also dominated by Army officers. One Combatant Command, Indo-Pacific Command (previously known as Pacific Command), was historically led by Navy officers and has never been led by officers from any other branch. There was an attempt to place other than Navy officers to lead the Indo-Pacific Command, but the attempt eventually failed. Air Force officers rarely get the position as combatant command commanders and other important specific commands.

Special forces
Interservice rivalries are often played out at divisional or regimental level or between special forces that are part of different services. The rivalry between special-forces units led to the creation of United Kingdom Special Forces in the United Kingdom, and SOCOM in the United States to put them all under a unified command, putting an end to the "rice-bowl" doctrine which created absurd situations in Iran, Grenada, and Panama in the 1980s. In the United Kingdom, it has put an end to members of the Special Boat Service being recruited solely from the Royal Marines, and it is now a tri-service branch.

Special forces can also have rivalries with regular military units. For example, British special forces have rivalries with regular infantry units due to the latter being taught close-quarters combat, which the former was historically responsible for; this rivalry also relates to budgets, as infantry units requiring CQC training also require costly equipment and training facilities, thus using up money that could otherwise be spent on special forces or on other purposes.

See also
 National Security Act of 1947
 Goldwater–Nichols Act
 Revolt of the Admirals
 Joint warfare
 Essence of Decision

References

Military branches
Rivalry
Military sociology